Bhagalpur (Lok Sabha constituency) is one of the 40 Lok Sabha (parliamentary) constituencies in Bhagalpur in Bihar state in eastern India.

Vidhan Sabha segments 
Presently, Bhagalpur Lok Sabha constituency comprises the following six Vidhan Sabha (legislative assembly) segments:

Members of Lok Sabha
The following is the list of the Members of Parliament elected from this Lok Sabha constituency 

^ by-poll

Election results

2019 election

2014 election

1957 election 
 Banarshi Prasad Jhunjhunwala (INC) : 93,315 votes
 Chhabinath Singh (CPI) : 43,876

See also 
 Bhagalpur district
 List of Constituencies of the Lok Sabha

Notes

References

External links 
Bhagalpur lok sabha  constituency election 2019 date and schedule

Lok Sabha constituencies in Bihar
Politics of Bhagalpur district